The Roman Catholic Diocese of Nanyang is a diocese located in the city of Nanyang, Henan in the Ecclesiastical province of Kaifeng in China.

History
 1844: Established as Apostolic Vicariate of Honan 河南 from the Diocese of Nanjing 南京
 August 28, 1882: Renamed as Apostolic Vicariate of Southern Honan 河南南境
 December 3, 1924: Renamed as Apostolic Vicariate of Nanyangfu 南陽府
 April 11, 1946: Promoted as Diocese of Nanyang 南陽

Leadership
 Bishops of Nanyang 南陽 (Roman rite)
 Bishop Joseph Zhu Bao-yu (June 30, 2011 – present)
 Bishop Joseph Jin De-chen (1981 - 2011)
 Bishop Pietro Massa, P.I.M.E. (April 11, 1946 – February 19, 1978)
 Vicars Apostolic of Nanyangfu 南陽府 (Roman Rite)
 Bishop Pietro Massa, P.I.M.E. (March 29, 1938 – April 11, 1946)
 Bishop Flaminio Belotti, P.I.M.E. (June 14, 1917 – 1937)
 Vicars Apostolic of Southern Honan 河南南境 (Roman Rite)
 Bishop Simeone Volonteri, P.I.M.E. (September 1, 1882 – December 21, 1904)
 Vicars Apostolic of Honan 河南 (Roman Rite)
 Bishop Miguel Navarro, O.F.M. (April 8, 1856 – September 9, 1877)
 Bishop Jean-Henri Baldus, C.M. (March 2, 1844 – 1865)

References

External links
 GCatholic.org
 Catholic Hierarchy
 Diocese website (Chinese)

Roman Catholic dioceses in China
Religious organizations established in 1844
Roman Catholic dioceses and prelatures established in the 19th century
1844 establishments in China
Christianity in Henan
Religion in Nanyang, Henan